Stegommata leptomitella, the hakea leaf-miner is a species of moth in the Lyonetiidae family. It was described by Edward Meyrick in 1880. It is found in Australia, where it has been recorded from Queensland, New South Wales and Victoria. It is also present in New Zealand, where it is an established adventive.

The wingspan is about 8 mm. Adults are fawn.

References

External links
Butterflies and Moths of the World Generic Names and their Type-species

Lyonetiidae
Leaf miners
Moths described in 1880